Březinky is a municipality and village in Svitavy District in the Pardubice Region of the Czech Republic. It has about 100 inhabitants.

Administrative parts
The village of Nectava is an administrative part of Březinky.

References

Villages in Svitavy District